This article is about music-related events in 1827.

Events 
March 29 – The funeral of Ludwig van Beethoven is attended by huge crowds.
April 5 – Pope Leo XII honours Nicolo Paganini with the Order of the Golden Spur.
April 13 – 18-year-old soprano Eugenia Savorani marries Giovanni Tadolini, her 42-year-old singing teacher.
date unknown
Franz Liszt moves to Paris after the death of his father. He will live there for the next five years. He plays a concert in London that was attended by Ignaz Moscheles.
François Dauverné becomes one of the first musicians to use the new F three-valved trumpet in public performance.
Rossini's mother dies, prompting his return home to Bologna.
The term "Gesamtkunstwerk" is first used in print, in an essay by Eusebius Trahndorff; it is later adopted by Richard Wagner.
Soprano Laure-Cinthie Montalant marries the tenor Vincent-Charles Damoreau.
The Zagreb Music Association is founded; one of its earliest members is Ivan Padovec.

Popular music 

 "I'd Be a Butterfly" w.m. Thomas Haynes Bayly

Classical music 
Dionisio Aguado – 4 Rondos brillants, Op. 2
Hector Berlioz – La mort d’Orphée (cantata)
Frederic Chopin – Variations on "Là ci darem la mano" Op. 2
Carl Czerny 
3 Sonatines faciles et brillantes, Op. 104
Piano Sonata Nos.6–9, Opp. 124, 143–145
Grande Serenade concertante, Op.126
100 Progressive Studies, Op. 139
Concerto for Piano Four-Hands and Orchestra, Op. 153
Mauro Giuliani – 6 Airs Irlandois nationales variées (for guitar), Op. 125
Fanny Hensel – 6 Lieder, Op.9, Nos. 1, "Die Ersehnte" and 5 "Der Maiabend"
Ferdinand Hiller 
"Le sénateur" (dated June 22)
"Wandrers Nachtlied"
Johann Wenzel Kalliwoda – Symphony No.1, Op. 7
Friedrich Kuhlau 
Flute Sonata, Op. 85
4 Sonatinas, Op. 88
Kaspar Kummer – Trio for Flute, Clarinet and Bassoon, Op. 32
Franz Liszt – Scherzo in G minor, S.153
Felix Mendelssohn 
7 Charakterstücke, Op.7
String Quartet No.2, Op.13
The Last Rose of Summer, Op.15
Piano Sonata No.3, Op.106 (dated May 31)
Tu es Petrus, Op.111
Christe, du Lamm Gottes, MWV 5
Ferdinand Ries 
Polonaise No.4, Op.140
3 Flute Quartets, WoO 35, No. 2 in G major
Pierre Rode – Violin Concerto No.11 in D major, Op. 23
Franz Schubert
Winterreise (song cycle)
Piano Trio No. 1
Piano Trio No. 2
Im Abendrot, D.799
Impromptus, D.899 and D.935
3 Gesänge, D.902
Zur guten Nacht, D.903
Alinde, D.904
An die Laute, D.905
Variations on a Theme from Herold's 'Marie', D. 908
Phantasie for violin and piano in C major, D.934
12 Valses nobles, D. 969
Ignaz Seyfried – Libera me Domine, continuation of Mozart's Requiem
Louis Spohr 
Violin Concerto No.11, Op. 70
Double String Quartet No.2, Op.77
Christoph Ernst Friedrich Weyse – Et Eventyr i Rosenborg Have (Singspiel)

Opera 
Vincenzo Bellini – Il Pirata
Michele Carafa – Les Deux Figaro
Felix Mendelssohn – Die Hochzeit des Camacho, Op.10 (premiered April 29 in Berlin)
Giovanni Pacini – Margherita regina d'Inghilterra
Louis Spohr – Pietro von Abano, premiered Oct. 13 in Kassel.

Births 
January 14 – Enderby Jackson, pioneer of the British brass band (d. 1903)
January 16 (or 17) – Antonio Giuglini, operatic tenor (d. 1865)
February 2 – Ludwig Eichrodt, lyricist (died 1892)
February 9 – Auguste Dupont, composer (died 1890)
February 12 – Alexander Wilhelm Gottschalg, composer (died 1908)
February 14 – José Costa, composer (died 1881)
February 18 – Marc Burty, music teacher and composer (died 1903)
March 5 
Hans Balatka, composer (d. 1899)
Emile Jonas, composer (died 1905)
March 26 – Emanuel Kania, composer (died 1887)
April 15 – Julius Tausch, composer (died 1895)
April 25 – Jean Antoine Zinnen, composer (d. 1898)
May 11 – Septimus Winner, composer (died 1902)
August 20 (or 22) – Josef Strauss, waltz composer (d. 1870)
August 22 – Edouard Silas, composer (died 1909)
August 23 – Simon Waley, composer (died 1875)
September 5 – Goffredo Mameli, lyricist of the Italian national anthem (d. 1849)
September 13 – Catherine Winkworth, hymnist (died 1878)
October 6 – Karl Riedel, conductor (died 1888)
November 7 – Theodor Bernhard Sick, composer (died 1893)
November 12 – Gustav Merkel, organist and composer (d. 1885)
November 20 – Edmond Dédé, composer (died 1903)
November 26 – Hugo Ulrich, composer, teacher and arranger (d. 1872)
December 24 – Lisa Cristiani, cellist (died 1853)
December 31 – Marie Caroline Miolan-Carvalho, French operatic soprano (d. 1895)
date unknown
Martino Frontini, composer (d. 1909)
George Lichtenstein, Hungarian-born pianist and music teacher (d. 1893)

Deaths 
January 18 – John Hoyland, organist and composer (b. 1783)
January 30 – Johann Philipp Christian Schulz, composer (b. 1773)
February 2 – Johann Nepomuk Kalcher, opera composer (b. 1764)
February 11 – José Lidon, composer and musician (born 1748)
February 26 – David Moritz Michael, composer (b. 1751)
March 9 – Franz Xaver Gerl, operatic bass and composer (b. 1764)
March 26 – Ludwig van Beethoven, composer (b. 1770)
April 3 – Ernst Chladni, physicist and musician, "Father of acoustics" (b. 1756)
May 9 – Friedrich Wilhelm Berner, composer (born 1780)
June 4 – Stephan von Breuning, librettist (born 1774)
July 17 – Charles Borremans, violinist and conductor (b. 1769)
July 25 – Gottfried Christoph Härtel, music publisher (born 1763)
August 2 – James Hewitt, composer, conductor and music publisher (b. 1770)
August 3 – Lorenz Leopold Haschka, lyricist of the Austrian national anthem (b. 1749)
August 9 – Marc-Antoine Madeleine Désaugiers, composer, dramatist and songwriter (b. 1772)
August 28 – Adam Liszt, Hungarian musician, father of Franz Liszt (b. 1776)
September 8 – Reginald Spofforth, composer (b. 1769)
September 30 – Wilhelm Müller, lyricist (born 1794)
November 6 – Bartolomeo Campagnoli, violinist (b. 1751)
November 11 – Franz von Walsegg, count who commissioned Mozart's Requiem (b. 1763)
November 20 – Alexey Nikolayevich Titov, violinist and composer (b. 1769)
date unknown
James Hook, composer (b. 1746)
Syama Sastri, oldest of the Trinity of Carnatic music (b. 1762)

References

 
19th century in music
Music by year